The 1942 Texas Tech Red Raiders football team represented Texas Technological College—now known as Texas Tech University—as a member of the Border Conference during the 1942 college football season. Led by second-year head coach Dell Morgan, the Red Raiders compiled an overall record of 4–5–1 with a mark of 3–0–1 in conference play, sharing the Border Conference title with Hardin–Simmons. This was Texas Tech's The second Border Conference championship. The team played home games at Tech Field in Lubbock, Texas.

Schedule

References

Texas Tech
Texas Tech Red Raiders football seasons
Texas Tech Red Raiders football